Vladimir Stepanovich Glotov (January 23, 1938 – 1981) was a Soviet Russian footballer. He was born in Elton, Volgograd Oblast.

Honours
 Soviet Top League winner: 1963.

International career
He earned 5 caps for the USSR national football team, and participated in the 1964 European Nations' Cup, where the Soviets were the runners-up.

External links
Profile of Vladimir Glotov 
Biography of Vladimir Glotov 

1938 births
1981 deaths
Russian footballers
Soviet footballers
Soviet Union international footballers
1964 European Nations' Cup players
FC Dynamo Moscow players
Soviet Top League players

Association football defenders
Sportspeople from Volgograd Oblast